Newton station in the USA is a historic railroad depot in Newton, Mississippi. 

It was located on the A & V (Alabama and Vicksburg) Railroad. It was built in 1904, and later operated by the Illinois Central. It was added to the National Register of Historic Places in 1990 as the Alabama and Vicksburg Railroad Depot. It is now used by the Newton Chamber of Commerce.

During the American Civil War, on April 24, 1863, Federal troops under General Benjamin Grierson struck the Vicksburg-Meridian rail route, tore up tracks and burned the Newton depot.

See also
 National Register of Historic Places listings in Mississippi
 List of Mississippi Landmarks

References

External links
Photograph of the depot on Flickr
History

Railway stations on the National Register of Historic Places in Mississippi
Railway stations in the United States opened in 1904
Mississippi Landmarks
National Register of Historic Places in Newton County, Mississippi
Newton